Landsöhr Castle, also called Landseer Castle (Burg Landseer) or Bertaburg, is a lost spur castle on a northern spur, of the Kornberg near Bad Boll in the county of Göppingen in Baden-Württemberg.

The castle was probably built during the Celtic period as a refuge castle. The present burgstall only consists of two hollows between which the castle was probably located.

In the 12th century Berta von Boll, a sister of King  Conrad III, is supposed to have had her dower seat here.

References

Literature 
 Konrad Albrecht Koch: Burgenkundliche Beiträge zum Oberamt Göppingen. In: Blätter des Schwäbischen Albvereins. 1926.
 Hartwig Zürn: Boll. In: Die vor- und frühgeschichtlichen Geländedenkmale und die mittelalterlichen Burgstellen der Kreise Göppingen und Ulm. 1961.
 Günter Schmitt: Landsöhr (Bertaburg). In: Derselbe: Burgenführer Schwäbische Alb, Band 1 – Nordost-Alb: Wandern und entdecken zwischen Aalen und Aichelberg. Biberacher Verlagsdruckerei, Biberach an der Riß, 1988, pp. 321–326.

External links 
 Landsöhr Castle at viremo.eludi.net